Miers may refer to:

 People
Sir Anthony Miers VC (1906–1985), Royal Navy admiral
Sir David Miers (born 1937), British ambassador
Earl Schenck Miers (1910–1972), American historian
Edward J. Miers (1851–1930), English zoologist
Harriet Miers (born 1945), American lawyer and failed Supreme Court nominee
Henry Miers (1858–1942), British mineralogist and crystallographer
John Miers (artist) (1756–1821), British artist
John Miers (botanist) (1789–1879), British botanist
Marcos Miers (born 1990), Paraguayan footballer
Max Miers (born 1940), Australian rules footballer
Robert W. Miers (1848–1930), U.S. Representative from Indiana
Thomasina Miers (born 1976), English cook, writer and television presenter

 Other
 Miers, Lot, a commune in France

Jewish surnames
Yiddish-language surnames